William Harrop may refer to:

 William C. Harrop (born 1929), U.S. ambassador
 William Harrop (RAF officer) (died 1948), British World War I flying ace